Diana Coomans (16 August 1861 – 18 June 1952) was a Belgian painter.

Coomans was born in Paris as the daughter of the painter Pierre Olivier Joseph Coomans (1816–1889) and Adelaide Lacroix (1838–1884). Her sister Heva Coomans and her brother Oscar-Jean Coomans (1848–1884) were also painters. Like her father and sister, she specialized in romantic portrayals of the original inhabitants of Pompei before the eruption of Vesuvius devastated life there. Her 1885 work In the Gynaeceum was included in the book Women Painters of the World.

Coomans died in New York City.

References

Diana Coomans on artnet

1861 births
1952 deaths
Artists from Paris
Belgian women painters
Sibling artists
19th-century Belgian painters
19th-century Belgian women artists
20th-century Belgian painters
20th-century Belgian women artists